Santiago e São Simão de Litém e Albergaria dos Doze is a civil parish in the municipality of Pombal, Portugal.  It was formed in 2013 by the merger of the former parishes Santiago de Litém, São Simão de Litém and Albergaria dos Doze. The population in 2011 was 5,384, in an area of 69.89 km2.

References

Parishes of Pombal, Portugal
Populated places established in 2013
2013 establishments in Portugal